Sisoridae is a family of catfishes. These Asian catfishes live in fast-moving waters and often have adaptations that allow them to adhere to objects in their habitats. The family includes about 235 species.

Taxonomy
The family Sisoridae is recognized as a natural, monophyletic group based on morphological and molecular evidence. It is divided into two subfamilies, Sisorinae and Glyptosterninae (glyptosternoids). The Sisorinae contain the five genera Bagarius, Gagata, Gogangra, Nangra, and Sisor. The Glyptosterninae contain three tribes. Glyptothoracini contains only the genus Glyptothorax and Pseudecheneidina contains only the genus Pseudecheneis. The remaining genera, Chimarrichthys, Exostoma, Glaridoglanis, Glyptosternon, Myersglanis, Oreoglanis, Parachiloglanis, Pareuchiloglanis, and Pseudexostoma, are contained in the tribe Glyptosternina. The monophyly of the entire family and the tribe Glyptosterninae are well supported by osteological morphology and molecular data.

In the genera Glyptothorax (tribe Glyptothoracini) and Pseudecheneis (tribe Pseudecheneidina), the species have thoracic adhesive apparatuses to attach to objects in the stream bed; in Glyptothorax, grooves of this apparatus run parallel or oblique to the axis of the body, while in Pseudecheneis grooves run transverse to the axis of the body. The thoracic adhesive apparatus is not present in the other sisorid genera. The paired fins may be plaited to form an adhesive apparatus in Pseudecheneis, glyptosternoids, and variably in Glyptothorax. Thus, glyptosternoids lack a thoracic adhesive apparatus, but do have plaited paired fins, and members of the subfamily Sisorinae lack either a thoracic adhesive apparatus or plaited paired fins.

The monophyly of certain glyptosternoid genera is doubtful. The paraphyly of Pareuchiloglanis, Oreoglanis, and Pseudexostoma (with the possible inclusion of Myersglanis and Parachiloglanis) has been demonstrated and a rediagnosis of glyptosternine genera is needed.

Evidence from a 2007 molecular analysis supports polyphyly of Pareuchiloglanis. Glaridoglanis might be a basal member of the tribe Glyptosternina. Pseudecheneis may be placed in the tribe Glyptosternina, but its sister-group relationship between it and the monophyletic glyptosternoids cannot be rejected.

It has been proposed to move the genera of Erethistidae into Sisoridae.

Distribution
Sisorids inhabit freshwater and originate from southern Asia, from Turkey and Syria to South China and Borneo, primarily in the Oriental region. Glyptosterninae is distributed from the Caucasus to China. Most glyptosternine genera are found in China, with the exception of Myersglanis. Glyptosternoid catfish species have restricted distributions, and many apparently wide-ranging species have been shown to consist of more than one species, each with restricted distributions. Sisorids are mostly small forms inhabit mountain streams.

Fossil record and biogeography
The oldest known sisorid fossil is B. bagarius found in Sumatra and India of the Pliocene. The origin of glyptosternoid fishes could be in the later Pliocene. Another study proposes glyptosternoids possibly originated in the Oligocene-Miocene boundary (19–24 Mya) and radiated from the Miocene to Pleistocene along with several rapid speciation events in a relatively short time. The three great uplifts of the Qinghai/Tibet Plateau destroyed the pattern of river systems in the late Pliocene to the early Pleistocene. The ancestor of Euchiloglanis originated from the allied Glyptosternon in the second uplift and Pareuchiloglanis, Pseudexostoma, Oreoglanis, Exostoma, and Glaridoglanis originated with the third uplift. The Exostoma group (Exostoma, Pseudexostoma, and Oreoglanis) originated after the outline of the Qinghai/Tibet Plateau was formed. The speciation of this group was not strong and the distribution limited.

Description
Most of these fish have four pairs of barbels and a large adipose fin. The maximum size is 2 metres. In all fish except those of the subfamily Sisorinae, some sort of adhesive apparatus, either in the form of a thoracic adhesive apparatus or in plaited paired fins, allow the fish to adhere to objects.

References

 
Fish of South Asia
Catfish families
Taxa named by Pieter Bleeker
Extant Pliocene first appearances